Morro do Diabo, literally "Devil's Hill", is a distinctive hill formation in Rio Grande do Sul, Brazil.

Geography
Morro do Diabo is an area landmark, seen from the valleys and plains below it. It is located near the cities of Caxias do Sul and Porto Alegre, the state capital.

Morro do Diabo and the lower surrounding natural areas support Atlantic Forest habitat flora and fauna.

Recreation
Tourists are welcome on Morro do Diabo to enjoy the vast views of the plains spreading below it. Enthusiasts of outdoor sports use the hill for recreation and to practice skills.

Paragliding
Morro do Diabo is used by paraglider pilots as a launch site and sometimes as a landing site as well.

The place is under frequent maintenance by the members of the Clube Vale dos Ventos de Voo Livre (Wind Valley Soaring Club) and is registered as a no plane flying area by the federal aviation organisation, bringing safer conditions to the practice of paragliding.

The pilots and their families frequently use the facilities of the Sky Company Hostel just below the hill, a place to recuperate and to meet other pilots. It serves as a meeting point for all the people who want to go to the top.

See also
 List of plants of Atlantic Forest vegetation of Brazil
 Ecoregions of the Atlantic Forest biome

References

External links

Hills of Brazil
Landforms of Rio Grande do Sul